Stephanie McLean  is a British model who was the Penthouse Pet of the Month for April 1970 and Pet of the Year in 1971.(She was the first Pet Of The Year in the US) She also appeared in Mayfair magazine on the cover of volume 5 issue 12 under the name "Gabrielle Nolan" and again in Mayfair magazine in volume 8 issue 8 but this time under her own name.

Career
Born Stephanie Harrison, after starting her career in fashion modeling, she posed in both Mayfair magazine and as a Penthouse cover girl.
Stephanie was the Penthouse Pet Of The Month for April 1970 and was selected as the 1971 Pet Of The Year, being featured in a pictorial and on the cover of the September issue. She has the distinction of being the first awarded the title in the US.

Personal life
McLean met British motorcycle racer Barry Sheene, in 1975, while he was on crutches following a racing accident. After divorcing her first husband, she and Sheene married in 1984, and had two children, a son and a daughter. The family emigrated to Australia in 1987, to try to ease Sheene's arthritis from his racing injuries. Following a battle with throat and stomach cancers, Sheene died in March 2003.

See also
 List of Penthouse Pets of the Year

References

External links 
 

Year of birth missing (living people)
Place of birth missing (living people)
Living people
British female adult models
Penthouse Pets of the Year
British expatriates in Australia